The Dunsmore Cup is a Canadian sports trophy, presented annually to the winner of the university-level football competition conducted by Réseau du sport étudiant du Québec (RSEQ), the governing body for all student sports in the province of Quebec. The RSEQ university football conference, one of four within U Sports, was known as the Quebec University Football League before the 2011 season.

The Cup was first awarded in 1980 to the winner of the Ontario-Quebec Interuniversity Football Conference and, upon re-organization into the Quebec Intercollegiate Football Conference (later the Quebec University Football League and now part of RSEQ), continues to be awarded as the Quebec conference's championship.

The winner of the Dunsmore Cup goes on to play in either the Uteck Bowl or the Mitchell Bowl national semi-final, depending on annual rotations.

The Dunsmore Cup was donated by Bob Dunsmore of Queen's University, a 1915 Engineering graduate.

Winners

 (*) Ottawa and Laval were later forced to forfeit all post season titles for use of ineligible players during the season.

Records

Note: Since 2001, Queen's and Ottawa have played in the Ontario University Athletics conference and no longer compete for the Dunsmore Cup.

Note: Carleton re-established their football program in 2013, after a 15-year absence, they now compete in the Ontario University Athletics conference and no longer compete for the Dunsmore Cup.

Note: Bishop's moved to the Atlantic University Sport conference for the 2017 U Sports football season and no longer competes for the Dunsmore Cup.

References 

U Sports football trophies and awards
Recurring events established in 1980
Canadian football in Quebec